Metodi Maksimov (born 20 August 2002) is a Macedonian professional footballer who plays as a right winger for Rabotnichki in the First Macedonian Football League.

Career

Club career
Maksimov made his senior football debut on 9 August 2020 at the age of 17, by playing the opening 60 minutes for Rabotnichki against Makedonija G. P. in the first round of the 2020–21 Macedonian First Football League season. That season he went on to play 25 games, throughout which he also assisted two goals.

International
Ever since 2018 Maksimov has been regular at most of North Macedonia's national youth teams.

He made his debut for North Macedonia national football team on 22 October 2022 in a friendly match against Saudi Arabia.

References

External links
 
 

2002 births
Living people
Association football wingers
Macedonian footballers
Macedonian expatriate footballers
North Macedonia youth international footballers
North Macedonia under-21 international footballers
North Macedonia international footballers
FK Rabotnički players
Macedonian First Football League players